Charles "Charlie" Hartmann (1 July 1898 - 1 September 1982) was a New Orleans jazz trombonist.

Hartmann was born in New Orleans on July 1, 1898. Hartmann played with the bands of Johnny Bayersdorffer, Tony Parenti, and Johnny Wiggs.  He was secretary of Local 174 of the American Federation of Musicians for many years. Charles Hartman died in Springfield, Tennessee.

References

Sources
 New Orleans Jazz: A Family Album by Al Rose and Edmond Souchon

1898 births
1982 deaths
Jazz musicians from New Orleans
American jazz trombonists
Male trombonists
20th-century American musicians
20th-century trombonists
20th-century American male musicians
American male jazz musicians